Count Manó Andrássy de Csíkszentkirály et Krasznahorka (3 March 1821 – 23 April 1891) was a Hungarian painter, caricaturist, collector, traveler, and politician. He was a member of the Hungarian Academy of Sciences. He served as a representative in the Diet of Hungary from 1881 to 1891.

He participated in the Hungarian Revolution of 1848. After the defeat he lived in emigration, at that time he traveled Asia (mainly China and India). After his return, he acquired great merit for the regulation of the Tisza river. He became Count (comes) of Gömör és Kis-Hont and Zemplén Counties.

Family
His parents were Count Károly Andrássy, a politician and Countess Etelka Szapáry. His younger brother was Gyula Andrássy Sr., Prime Minister of Hungary and Minister of Foreign Affairs of Austria-Hungary. Manó married Countess Gabriella Pálffy de Erdőd (1833–1914).

Works
 Az Utazás Kelet Indiákon: Ceylon, Java, Khina, Bengal (1853)
 Hazai vadászatok és sport (editor, 1857)

External links

 Művészeti Kislexikon,  Akadémiai Kiadó, 1973
 
 

1821 births
1891 deaths
Hungarian politicians
Mano
Members of the Hungarian Academy of Sciences
19th-century Hungarian painters